Marie-Laure Valla is a French set dresser and set decorator. She was nominated for the Academy Award for Best Art Direction for her work in Amélie (2001).

References

External links

French set decorators
Year of birth missing (living people)
Living people
Place of birth missing (living people)